Josh Joplin (born Joshua David Blum on January 1, 1972) is an American singer, songwriter, as well as music and film producer. He has founded the bands Josh Joplin Group and Among The Oak & Ash. His song "Camera One" was the first independent release to hit #1 at Triple A radio.  His song "Blue Skies Again" was recorded by Jessica Lea Mayfield for her Nonesuch debut Tell Me. Pitchfork praised it as, "simple, the infectious chorus makes it a standout...it's also a sunny, reassuring song." Joplin has toured extensively in North America, Europe, and Australia, and has recorded several albums with different bands.

Life and career

Born in Washington, DC, Joplin grew up in Lancaster County, Pennsylvania. His family relocated to Columbia, Maryland, when he was thirteen. Josh attended Sandy Spring Friends School and learned from his headmaster in the seventh grade how to play guitar. He quit the school's Community House program in the ninth grade and finished the year at Hammond High School. He briefly returned before dropping out of high school altogether. At the age of sixteen, Joplin successfully passed the GED and earned his Maryland high school diploma.

Inspired by William Least Heat-Moon's travelogue Blue Highways and Woody Guthrie's Bound for Glory, Joplin picked up his guitar and left home in a 1976 Volkswagen camper van and spent two years on and off the road, before settling in Denver, Colorado. His first professional job in music was as the runner for folk/blues legend Dave Van Ronk's concert at Swallow Hill Music Association. They hired him later the same year to open for Bill Staines.

Joplin's interest in folk music began in earnest after hearing Bob Dylan's The Times They Are a-Changin', and Phil Ochs' Gunfight at Carnegie Hall. He recorded an Ochs cover, "I Ain't a Marchin' Anymore", on his first record, Facts of Fortune for Sleepless Nights Records, a DC record label, founded by Mr. Issa (Diao) of Good Clean Fun.
Joplin released his first album in 1989, titled A Present for Hitler. Geoffrey Himes gave Joplin his very first notice, in the Columbia Flier, in 1990.

Atlanta
Having stayed a short time in New York City, Joplin heard Kevn Kinney on WFUV and bought his record, MacDougal Blues. This convinced him to relocate to Atlanta. He played mostly solo shows for tips at Sylvia's Atomic Cafe, a Candler Park neighborhood landmark. It was here that Josh met fellow songwriter Kelly Hogan, who worked there as a cook and played in The Jody Grind. He also met Shawn Mullins at the cafe.  Upon seeing Five-Eight opening for The Jody Grind, Joplin began to look for a band of his own.

He recorded his third and last album for Sleepless Nights, I Love Janey, But Janey Loves The Grateful Dead. It was produced by Ed Burdell (Magnapop). Members of The Mirthmakers and Joybang backed Joplin on the recording. For a while, he played music  with Ani Cordero on drums and a friend on bass, but he finally emerged with his own lineup. In 1995, Geoff Melkonian (bass, viola) and Jason Buecker (drums) founded the Josh Joplin Band. They released the albums Projector Head and Boxing Nostalgic as a trio, later adding Allen Broyles on piano and organ. Shawn Mullins signed the quartet to his own SMG Label. He produced the original version of Useful Music, Joplin's sixth studio album. Shortly after its release, Jason Buecker was replaced on drums by Ani Cordero, then Eric Taylor. Deeds Davis was added on lead guitar and the band made a slight name change: Josh Joplin Group. 

Artemis Records re-released Useful Music in 2001 and scored the band's first and only number one hit at Triple A radio with "Camera One", which was produced by Jerry Harrison of The Modern Lovers and Talking Heads. The band made their television debut that year, appearing on the Late Show with David Letterman, followed by Late Night with Conan O'Brien. "Camera One" was also featured in the TV shows Scrubs, Dawsons Creek, Party of Five, Roswell, among others.

New York City
Joplin moved to Brooklyn, New York in 1998. He continued to tour and play with Josh Joplin Group as well as doing solo shows. The band followed the success of Useful Music with the album The Future That Was, produced by Rob Gal (The Rock-A-Teens). It was recorded at Adam Schlesinger and James Iha's studio, Stratosphere Sound. Though it received much more critical acclaim, it had very little commercial success. Josh Joplin Group disbanded in December 2003.

In 2004, Joplin was still living in Cobble Hill, Brooklyn, across the street from his then-neighbor, Dan Zanes (The Del Fuegos). Dan hosted impromptu stoop concerts for the children (and adults) on the block. Joplin stated being deeply inspired by these intimate events. When he recorded the album Jaywalker, he sought ways to mimic the joy he witnessed with Zanes by recording the album with the friends and people he'd grown up with, including the headmaster who had taught him guitar. Jaywalker was released on August 23, 2005, on Eleven Thirty Records.

In 2013, Joplin independently released the five-song EP Earth and Other Things on 9th Grade Records. It remains his last musical effort under the name Josh Joplin. It was recorded at Mercy Sound Studio on the Lower East Side of New York City by producer/engineer/guitarist Matt Chiaravalle.  Matt and Josh had also worked together on Useful Music.

On April 23, 2022, the Josh Joplin Group performed a twentieth-anniversary reunion show in Atlanta, Georgia.

Among The Oak & Ash
In 2008, Joplin formed a new band called Among The Oak & Ash with Garrison Starr, Bryan Owings, and Brian Harrison. They released their self-titled debut album in 2009 on Verve Records. It was named Album of the Year by WNYC's John Schaeffer on his program Soundcheck.They followed it with Devil Ship in 2011. This album featured performances by Lucy Wainwright Roche, Jessica Lea Mayfield, Paleface, and Rachael Hester. In 2014, they recorded a third album, A Skeptics Gospel, which was never released. Harrison, who had co-produced all three records, died at his Nashville studio on February 18, 2014.

NarrowMoat
In 2015, Blum, who by now had shed his musical pseudonym, founded the production company NarrowMoat. He has produced two independent films, About Colonia and The Murphys.  About Colonia, directed by Eduardo Shlomo Velázquez, was screened and lauded with awards in the short film and Spanish-language categories at several international film festivals.

Discography
 A Present for Hitler (1989) Josh Joplin
 Facts of Fortune (1990) Josh Joplin
 I Love Janey, But Janey Loves the Grateful Dead (1992) Josh Joplin
 Projector Head (1995)  Josh Joplin Band
 Boxing Nostalgic (1997)  Josh Joplin Band
 Useful Music (1998) (re-issued in 2001) Josh Joplin Band
 The Future That Was (2002)  Josh Joplin Group
  The Early Years: Volume One (Compilation - 2004)  Josh Joplin
 Jaywalker (2005) Josh Joplin
 Among the Oak & Ash (2009)  Among the Oak & Ash
 Devil Ship (2011)  Among the Oak & Ash
 Earth and Other Things (EP – 2013) Josh Joplin

References

External links
 Jaywalker review, dailyvault.com, August 23, 2005.
 Q&A with Josh Joplin and Garrison Starr

American male singers
American rock singers
Living people
People from Columbia, Maryland
People from Lancaster County, Pennsylvania
Singers from Pennsylvania
Singers from Maryland
1972 births